Pacific East Mall is an Asian mall in Richmond, California. It is owned by Pacific Infinity Company Incorporated.

History
The mall opened in 1998 in Richmond's Annex neighborhood, directly adjacent to the borders of El Cerrito and Albany, at a former Breuner's location. The commercial center's largest tenant is a 99 Ranch Supermarket, and the rest of the mall is flanked by shops, restaurants, boutiques, and services such as tax and beauty, owned and operated by Asians, particularly Taiwanese, Japanese, and Korean. The Asian Pearl Seafood Restaurant is popular amongst family diners.

The mall is located along Pierce Street a frontage road that runs parallel to Interstate 80, near Interstate 580. The nearest major junction is at Central Avenue, allowing access to the two freeways and to San Pablo Avenue. AC Transit line 80 serves stops along both Pierce Street and Central Avenue, near the mall. As of December 5, 2021, line 80 has been temporarily suspended.

Cerrito Creek
Cerrito Creek lies adjacent to Pacific East Mall, and runs through a portion of the parking lot. The president of Friends of Five Creeks, a local environmental organization, has criticized the mall management for allegedly allowing herbicide to spread into the creek area, mowing areas containing native plants, and failing to establish a remediation plan.

References

External links
Official website

Asian-American culture in California
Buildings and structures in Richmond, California
Shopping malls in the San Francisco Bay Area
Shopping malls established in 1998
Shopping malls in Contra Costa County, California
Tourist attractions in Richmond, California
1998 establishments in California